The 1905 Lancashire Cup was the inaugural year for the rugby league Lancashire Cup competition. The cup was won by Wigan who beat Leigh in a replay at Wheater's Field, Broughton, Salford by a score of 8-0.

Background 

Following the great schism of 1895 which led to the formation of rugby league there was an interest in a competitive competition for clubs based in Lancashire.  Prior to the breakaway from rugby union this was something that had been discouraged as it was feared that competition would lead to professionalism, as had happened in other sports like Association Football.

There appears to be very little, if any, details of how this came about, or any details of any of the instigators or of any campaign, but the County Cups became the last part of what would become known as the four cups.

The competitions were played on the same basis as was the Challenge Cup, i.e. a free draw with matches played on a sudden death straight knock-out basis, and with the final played (usually) on a neutral ground.

Competition and results

Round 1  
Involved 6 matches (with two byes) and 14 Clubs.

Round 2 – quarterfinals

Round 3 – semifinals

Final 
The attendance was 10,000 and receipts £200. The initial final (which had taken place 9 days earlier at the same venue) had ended in a 0-0 draw before a crowd estimated at 16.000 and receipts of £400.

Teams and scorers  

Scoring - Try = three (3) points - Goal = two (2) points - Drop goal = two (2) points

The road to success

Notes and comments 

1 * Chadderton was a junior (or amateur) club from Oldham

2 * Wheater's Field was the home ground of Broughton Rangers with a capacity of 20,000

See also 
1905–06 Northern Rugby Football Union season

References

RFL Lancashire Cup
Lancashire Cup